Eriocampa is a genus of common sawflies in the family Tenthredinidae. There are about ten described species in Eriocampa.

 Seven fossil species are known (see Eriocampa tulameenensis).

Species
These five species belong to the genus Eriocampa:
 Eriocampa dorpatica Konow, 1887 g
 Eriocampa juglandis b (butternut woollyworm)
 Eriocampa mitsukurii Rohwer, 1910 g
 Eriocampa ovata (Linnaeus, 1761) g b (alder sawfly)
 Eriocampa umbratica (Klug, 1816) g
Data sources: i = ITIS, c = Catalogue of Life, g = GBIF, b = Bugguide.net

References

Further reading

External links

 

Tenthredinidae